The Raymore-Peculiar R-II School District (Ray-Pec) is a public school district with its headquarters in Peculiar, Missouri, United States. It is a suburban school district in a quickly developing area, and many new students are being enrolled.

The district, in Cass County, includes all of Peculiar and Raymore as well as an eastern portion of Belton, sections of Lee's Summit, and much of Lake Winnebago, as well as unincorporated areas.

Schools 
The district operates 7 elementary schools,  2 middle schools and 2 high schools.

Elementary schools 
Bridle Ridge Elementary School 
Creekmoor Elementary School 
Eagle Glenn Elementary School 
Peculiar Elementary School 
Raymore Elementary School 
Stonegate Elementary School 
Timber Creek Elementary School

Middle schools
Raymore-Peculiar East Middle School 
Raymore-Peculiar South Middle School

High schools
Raymore-Peculiar High School 
Raymore-Peculiar Academy

References

External links
 

School districts in Missouri
Education in Cass County, Missouri